Votkurzya (Wotköryä) is a rural locality (a village) in Tangatarovsky Selsoviet, Burayevsky District, Bashkortostan, Russia. The population was 30 as of 2010. There is one street.

Geography 
Votkurzya is located 36 km southwest of Burayevo (the district's administrative centre) by road. Kadrikovo is the nearest rural locality.

References 

Rural localities in Burayevsky District